Clan Hall is a clan of Norman descent. The clan has no position under Scots law as contrary to modern myth they were not Scots, nor considered themselves as such, and have no chief recognised by the Court of the Lord Lyon.

History
Scottish history indicates that the name "Hall", is a Norman surname. The name Hall, was found in Lincolnshire, England where they were granted lands after the Norman Conquest in 1066.

Upon entering England, the Halls were actually members of the Fitz William family, they being settled in Greatford Hall in Lincolnshire, and being directly descended from Wentworth, Earl FitzWilliam. The younger son of this noble house, Arthur FitzWilliam, was called 'Hall', to distinguish him from his senior brother. Arthur Hall would be the first on record about the year 1090. The line continued in Lincolnshire, and intermarried with the Crispins, and the Earls of Chester. In Cheshire England, the Halls were a cadet branch of the Kingsley Halls of that county. By 1340, the name had moved northward at the invitation of Earl David of Huntingdon, later to become King David II of Scotland. In Scotland, they were granted lands in Berwickshire, specifically the lands of Glenryg in the barony of Lesmahagow.

The first Hall of Fulbar in Renfrewshire was Thomas Hall, surgeon, who for his faithful service obtained from King Robert II a grant of land in the tenement of Staneley, barony of Renfrewshire, in 1370. Adam Hall, ancestor to the laird of Fulbar was at Battle of Flodden in 1513. The direct line of Hall of Fulbar ceased in 1550.

Border Reivers
The Halls were one of the sixty major riding families of the Scottish Marches and were involved in reiving as other border clans were. During one of the 'Day of Truce' occasions, a Robert Spragon 'fyled' a complaint against two Halls that had rustled 120 sheep. As with all Reiving families, they would consider themselves loyal to neither the English or the Scots, the family name holding allegiance over all else. As recounted in the song "The Death of Parcy Reed", the Hall's betray and stand idly by as the Laird of Troughend, Parcy Reed is murdered by the Crosier Clan. A betrayal that was to add to their reputation as one of the most notorious of families, and lead to their downfall whereupon they were forced to leave the Marches.

Traditional Homes of Clan Hall
The traditional homes of the Halls were at Redesdale, East Teviotdale, and Liddesdale. Other Halls lived in Aynstrother; Glenryg, in the barony of Lesmahagow; Garvald; Irvide; Glasgow; Sancharmvr, in Preswick; and Perth.

Battle of Otterburn
The village of Otterburn, Northumberland, known for the famous battle and border ballad of the same name, contains an old Pele tower that was owned at one time by the Umfravilles. The property passed into the possession of the Hall family. A Hall by the name of 'Mad Jack Hall' lived at Otterburn Hall, now a Hotel, and was also hanged, drawn and quartered at Tyburn for his participation in the 1715 Jacobite Rebellion.

17th century
By 1600, many branches had developed in England and Scotland: Lord Llanover, Sir John Hall, Bishop Hall of Bristol, Bishop Hall of Wearmouth, and at the same time, continuing their interest and seats at Skelton Castle, Yorkshire, Greatford Hall in Lincolnshire, and Gravell House in Middlesex. Notable amongst the family at this time was Hall of Berwickshire.

Clan Hall Society
Clan Hall Society was founded in Pikeville, KY. in August, 1993 with 23 charter members.  Atlas D. Hall, FSA Scot, was the first President and served until his death in November, 2006.  From the original membership it has grown and membership extends throughout the United States. They have a registered tartan Hall 2092. The Society emblem is a talbot head over 3 cranes. The motto is "Per Ardua ad Alta" meaning "Through difficulties to Heaven". The Society invites members of the families of Hall, Halle, Haule, Haul, Hal, DeAule, Haw, Crispin, Collingwood, Fitzwilliam and others interested in Border Reiver history.

References

External links
Clan Hall
Clan Hall Society

Scoto-Norman clans
Hall